Events from the year 2020 in Saint Lucia

Incumbents 

 Monarch: Elizabeth II
 Governor-General: Sir Neville Cenac
 Prime Minister: Allen Chastanet

Events 
Ongoing — COVID-19 pandemic in Saint Lucia

 13 March – The country's first confirmed case of COVID-19 is detected in a 63-year-old woman with travel history to the United Kingdom.
 23 March – The government declares a state of emergency due to the COVID-19 pandemic.

Sports 

 Saint Lucia at the 2020 Summer Olympics  – Due to the ongoing COVID-19 pandemic, the event was postponed until 23 July.

References 

 
Years of the 21st century in Saint Lucia
Saint Lucia
Saint Lucia
2020s in Saint Lucia